The Drums of Jeopardy is a 1931 American pre-Code horror film directed by George B. Seitz and starring Warner Oland, June Collyer and Lloyd Hughes. It is the second film adaptation of Harold McGrath's novel of the same name, and stars Oland as Dr. Boris Karlov. 

The name of the villain in the novel was originally called Boris Karlov, but when the actor Boris Karloff rose to prominence circa 1923, the character's name was changed to Gregor Karlov in the 1923 silent film adaptation to avoid confusion. It was changed back to Boris again in this 1931 remake of the film. The film's was produced by Tiffany Pictures, one of the leading independent studios in Hollywood. The sets were designed by the art director Fay Babcock.

Plot
In the Russian Empire, the nobleman Prince Gregor Petroff seduces chemist Boris Karlov's daughter Anya, who then commits suicide after becoming pregnant. After discovering Anya's body with the Drums of Jeopardy, a necklace owned by the Petroff family, Karlov vows revenge against them.

Dr. Karlov develops a poison gas to kill the Petroffs. After the Russian Revolution, Karlov joins the Bolsheviks and kills a general from the family. The rest of the family is evacuated to New York City by the U.S. Secret Service.

Karlov follows the Petroffs to America and corners them at a safe house in New Jersey. Although Gregor blames Nicholas, Karlov kills him and tries to take revenge by forcing Nicholas to murder his love interest Kitty Conover. They are rescued by the police, and Dr. Karlov is killed by his own gas.

Cast
Warner Oland as Dr. Boris Karlov
June Collyer as Kitty Conover
Lloyd Hughes as Prince Nicholas Petroff
Clara Blandick as Abbie Krantz
Hale Hamilton as Martin Kent
Wallace MacDonald as Prince Gregor Petroff
George Fawcett as General Petroff
Florence Lake as Anya Karlov
Mischa Auer as Peter
Ernest Hilliard as Prince Ivan Petroff
 Broderick O'Farrell as Dr. Brett
 Ann Brody as Taisya
 Murdock MacQuarrie as 	Stephen, the Butler 
 Julia Swayne Gordon as Banquet Guest
 Ruth Hall as Banquet Guest
 Robert Homans as Detective

Release
The film was first released on DVD on August 31, 2004.

Reception
On his website Fantastic Movie Musings and Ramblings, Dave Sindelar called it, "a very interesting variation on the typical horror revenge plot".
Dennis Schwartz from Ozus' World Movie Reviews awarded the film an "A−". In his review he wrote, "Despite the poor quality of its print, this PRC film reaches greatness in its portrayal of villainy and is worth watching despite the film's bad shape."

References

External links

 
 
 
 

1931 films
1931 horror films
1931 drama films
1930s mystery films
1930s English-language films
American black-and-white films
Films based on American novels
Films based on horror novels
Films directed by George B. Seitz
Tiffany Pictures films
American mystery films
American films about revenge
Remakes of American films
American horror drama films
American drama films
Films set in the Russian Empire
Russian Revolution films
Films about chemical war and weapons
Films about the United States Secret Service
Films set in New Jersey
Films set in the Soviet Union
Films set in New York City
Films about nobility
Films about refugees
1930s American films